The Book of the War is a hypertext multi-author novel presented in the form of an encyclopedia of the first 50 years of the War in the Faction Paradox universe based on the Doctor Who universe. The book was edited by Lawrence Miles, and written by Miles, Simon Bucher-Jones, Daniel O'Mahony, Ian McIntire, Mags L. Halliday, Helen Fayle, Philip Purser-Hallard, Kelly Hale, Jonathan Dennis, and Mark Clapham.

Content

Although various plot threads can be found in the book, its real value lies in the wealth of ideas on display. It's primarily a guide to many of the important factions involved in the War in Heaven. These include Faction Paradox itself, the Great Houses, the Celestis, the Remote, and Posthumanity. A number of hints about the mysterious Enemy against whom the Great Houses at fighting are scattered through the text, but nothing conclusive. The book details many individuals, events, technologies, and concepts related to the War.

The book makes references to the Doctor Who novels Alien Bodies, Interference, The Taking of Planet 5, and The Shadows of Avalon, and it features the characters Compassion and Chris Cwej who first appeared in Doctor Who novels. A number of other parallels with Doctor Who characters and concepts can be found, but these links are not explicit. No familiarity with Doctor Who is required to appreciate The Book of the War.

Characters and settings from The Book of the War appear in later Faction Paradox novels including Of the City of the Saved..., Warring States and Newtons Sleep, and the short story anthology A Romance in Twelve Parts.

See also
The otherwise unrelated novel Dictionary of the Khazars is a rare example of similar use of a non-linear encyclopedic structure for a work of fiction.

References

Faction Paradox
2002 British novels
Book of War
Encyclopedias of fictional worlds
Fiction with unreliable narrators
Novels by Lawrence Miles
Novels by Simon Bucher-Jones
Novels by Daniel O'Mahony
Novels by Mags L Halliday
Novels by Philip Purser-Hallard
Novels by Kelly Hale
Novels by Mark Clapham
Nonlinear narrative novels